T. bicornis may refer to:
 Tarachodes bicornis, a praying mantis species
 Trapa bicornis, a plant species

See also